Craig Scarpelli (born September 17, 1961) is a retired American soccer goalkeeper who played professionally in the North American Soccer League, United Soccer League and American Soccer League.

Scarpelli attended the University of Tampa where he played on the men's soccer team.  In 1980, Scarpelli joined the United States U-20 men's national soccer team as it qualified for the 1981 FIFA World Youth Championship.  He would play all three of the U.S. games in that tournament.  In December 1981, the Chicago Sting selected Scarpelli in the third round of the North American Soccer League draft, but there is no indication that he signed with the Sting.  In 1982, he did play for the Georgia Generals in the American Soccer League.  He was also drafted by the St. Louis Steamers of the Major Indoor Soccer League, but never entered a first team game.  In February 1983, the Fort Lauderdale Strikers purchased Scarpelli's contract from the Steamers.  He played several games for the Strikers during the 1983 Grand Prix of Indoor Soccer.  He played three pre-season games, then sat as the third string backup keeper during the regular season.  Following the 1983 season, the Strikers moved to Minnesota and Scarpelli gained time in six games during the 1984 season.  The league collapsed at the end of the season and the Strikers moved to the MISL for the 1984-1985 indoor season.  Scarpelli played five games during the indoor season then was released in July 1985.

Scarpelli is currently a chiropractor living in Brick, New Jersey.

References

External links
 NASL stats
 

1961 births
Living people
People from Brick Township, New Jersey
Sportspeople from Long Branch, New Jersey
Soccer players from New Jersey
American soccer players
American Soccer League (1933–1983) players
Georgia Generals players
Major Indoor Soccer League (1978–1992) players
Minnesota Strikers (NASL) players
North American Soccer League (1968–1984) players
North American Soccer League (1968–1984) indoor players
United States men's under-20 international soccer players
Tampa Spartans men's soccer players
Fort Lauderdale Strikers (1977–1983) players
Minnesota Strikers (MISL) players
Association football goalkeepers
Sportspeople from Monmouth County, New Jersey